St. George's School is a Church of England secondary school with academy status in Marton, Blackpool, Lancashire, England with an intake of both boys and girls aged 11–16. It is located on Cherry Tree Road and has an Ofsted rating of 1 out of 5.

Buildings
The school has undergone a number of refurbishments. A total of £5 Million was spent on the new buildings, including twelve new classrooms, two ICT suites, and a refectory that can hold up to 125 pupils. Other improvements include a new Arts and Crafts section, with five new classrooms and a Drama and Dance suite as well as a new gymnasium which is twice the size of a regulation basketball court. There is also a MUGA with football nets, netball rings and painted markers.

College System
In September 2013, St George's launched a collegiate system. Named after cathedral cities in England, all pupils are assigned to a college for the duration of their time in the school.

References

External links 
 Official website

Secondary schools in Blackpool
Church of England secondary schools in the Diocese of Blackburn
Academies in Blackpool